Charles Forbes may refer to:

People
Sir Charles Forbes, 1st Baronet (1774–1849), Scottish politician
Charles Forbes (Royal Navy officer) (1880–1960), British admiral
Charlie Forbes (1865–1922), Australian rules footballer
Charles Fergusson Forbes (1779–1852), English army surgeon
Charles John Forbes (1786–1862), British army officer and political figure in Canada East
Charles Noyes Forbes (1883–1920), American botanist
Charles R. Forbes (1878–1952), Scottish-American soldier, politician, and civil servant
Charles Forbes (Massachusetts judge), Justice of the Massachusetts Supreme Judicial Court

Other uses
 , chartered by the New Zealand Company in 1842

See also 
Charles Forbes-Leith (1859–1930), British army officer and politician
Charles Forbes René de Montalembert (1810–1870), French publicist and historian
Bertie Charles Forbes (1880–1954), Scottish-American financial writer and founder of the magazine, Forbes

Forbes, Charles